Nimari Keith Burnett (born December 20, 2001) is an American college basketball player for the Alabama Crimson Tide of the Southeastern Conference (SEC). He previously played for the Texas Tech Red Raiders.

Early life and high school career
Burnett played basketball for the eighth grade team at Beasley Elementary for three years and won a city championship. In his freshman season, he played for Morgan Park High School in Chicago and was teammates with junior Ayo Dosunmu. Burnett helped his team win the Class 3A state title, scoring 20 points in the championship. He earned MaxPreps Freshman All-American second team honors.

Entering his sophomore year, after initially enrolling at San Joaquin Memorial High School in Fresno, California, Burnett transferred to Prolific Prep, a national program based in Napa, California and began attending Napa Christian Campus of Education. He missed five weeks of his sophomore season with a broken hand. On April 14, 2019, Burnett won a gold medal with Attack at the USA 3x3 Under-18 Championship. As a senior, he averaged 25.5 points, 6.5 rebounds and 5.5 assists per game for Prolific Prep. Burnett was named Finals MVP of the Grind Session World Championship after scoring 37 points in a win over Our Saviour Lutheran School in the title game. He was selected to play in the McDonald's All-American Game and the Jordan Brand Classic, but both games were canceled due to the COVID-19 pandemic.

Recruiting
On November 12, 2019, Burnett committed to play college basketball for Texas Tech over offers from Alabama, Oregon and Michigan, among others. He became the highest-ranked recruit in program history. Burnett explained, "I chose Texas Tech because of the winning culture of the program and the coaching staff. It felt like a big family."

College career

Texas Tech
On December 6, 2020, Burnett recorded a freshman season-high 12 points and six steals in an 81–40 win over Grambling State. On January 7, 2021, he left Texas Tech due to personal reasons. As a freshman, Burnett came off the bench, averaging 5.3 points and 1.8 rebounds through 12 games.

Alabama
On April 8, 2021, Burnett announced that he had committed to Alabama. He was ruled out for the season on September 8, after undergoing right knee surgery.

National team career
In 2019, Burnett helped the United States win its first gold medal at the FIBA 3x3 U18 World Cup in Ulaanbaatar, Mongolia. He accumulated 40 points, the fifth-most in the tournament. He also won silver medal at the dunk contest.

Career statistics

College

|-
| style="text-align:left;"| 2020–21
| style="text-align:left;"| Texas Tech
| 12 || 0 || 17.7 || .280 || .174 || .889 || 1.8 || .9 || 1.4 || .5 || 5.3

Personal life
Burnett's mother Nikki Burnett opened a dollar store and became a real estate broker by the age of 25. Nikki created basketball apparel clothing lines BasketballMom and HoopLegend Apparel. She also helped start the Lifetime reality show Bringing Up Ballers, which follows the lives of several Chicago-based entrepreneur mothers whose children are talented basketball players. Burnett is one of the players featured in the show.

References

External links
Alabama Crimson Tide bio
Texas Tech Red Raiders bio
USA Basketball bio

2001 births
Living people
American men's basketball players
Basketball players from Chicago
McDonald's High School All-Americans
Point guards
Shooting guards
Texas Tech Red Raiders basketball players
Alabama Crimson Tide men's basketball players